Johann Lukas von Hildebrandt (14 November 1668 – 16 November 1745) was an Austrian baroque architect and military engineer who designed stately buildings and churches and whose work had a profound influence on the architecture of the Habsburg Empire in the eighteenth century. After studying in Rome under Carlo Fontana, he constructed fortresses for Prince Eugene of Savoy during his Italian campaigns, becoming his favorite architect. In 1700 he became court engineer in Vienna, and in 1711 was named head of the court department of building. He became court architect in 1723. His designs for palaces, estates, gardens, churches, chapels, and villas were widely imitated, and his architectural principles spread throughout central and southeast Europe. Among his more important works are Palais Schwarzenberg, St. Peter's Church, and Belvedere in Vienna, Savoy Castle in Ráckeve, Schönborn Palace in Göllersdorf, and Schloss Hof.

Life
Johann Lukas von Hildebrandt was born on 14 November 1668 in Genoa (Italy).

Hildebrandt was the son of an Italian mother and a German father. Hildebrandt studied under C. Fontana in Rome, and he studied civil and military engineering under Prince Eugene of Savoy also in Rome, and military engineering in Piedmont.  Hildebrandt became the favorite architect of Prince Eugène.

In 1696, Hildebrandt established himself thereafter in the Austrian capital, Vienna, where he worked for such noble families as the Dauns, Harrachs, Schönborns, and Starhembergs, and also Prince Eugene himself.

In 1700, Hildebrandt became Hofburg court engineer, in 1711, head of the Court dept. of building, and in 1723, Hildebrandt became Hofburg Court architect. At the Hofburg, however, Hildebrandt could not assert himself against the rivalry of the two Fischer von Erlachs (father Johann Bernhard and son Joseph Emanuel) and worked mainly for aristocrats. Unlike the monumental works of Johann Bernhard Fischer von Erlach, Hildebrandt's works seem more committed at a personal level and include more decorative elements. This helped his popularity spread to the middle class.  Hildebrandt united Italian and French elements and shaped the development of the baroque style in south Germany and Austria.

Hildebrandt was also involved in many great projects which were developed by other architects (e.g. Würzburg, Göttweig Abbey, Pommersfelden, Palais Schwarzenberg).

From 1713 to 1716, he was employed by the wealthy and powerful Kinsky family of Austria, building their residence, the Palais Kinsky, in Vienna. From 1723 on, he was inspector-general of the imperial buildings. His two best known works, the Upper Belvedere (1721–1722) and the Lower Belvedere (1714–1716), were both commissioned by Prince Eugene of Savoy.

Hildebrandt also worked in Bavaria on the Pommersfelden castle known as Schloss Weißenstein.

Hildebrandt built numerous city palaces in Vienna (e.g. Daun-Kinsky, 1716), his religious buildings are also of great importance (St. Peter's Church and Maria Treu Piaristenchurch in Vienna, Teutonic Church in Linz, or Dominican Church in Gabel, Czech Republic). 
 
Johann Lukas von Hildebrandt died on 16 November 1745 in Vienna.

Selected works
 Stadtpalais des Prinzen Eugen, 
 Sankt Laurentius, 
 Loreto Chapel, 
 Palais Starhemberg-Schönburg, 
 Palais Auersperg, 
 Lower Belvedere, 
 Piarist Church of Maria Treu, 
 Schönborn Palace, 
 Geheime Hofkanzlei (Bundeskanzleramt), 
 Imperial Crypt, 
 Savoy Castle, 
 Palais Schwarzenberg, 
 Upper Belvedere, 
 Deutschordenskirche Heilig Kreuz (Priesterseminarkirche), 
 Palais Kinsky, 
 Schloss Hof, 
 Hofburg Palace, Reichskanzleitrakt, 
 St. Peter's Church, 
 Palais Harrach, Pavillon and Januariuskapelle, 
 Parish Church, 
 Würzburg Residence, 
 Haus zum Goldenen Adler,

Gallery

References

External links

 
 

1668 births
1745 deaths
Austrian Baroque architects
Austrian people of Italian descent
Italian people of German descent
Austrian untitled nobility
Architects from Genoa
Architects from Vienna